Mike Hubbard may refer to:

 Mike Hubbard (baseball) (born 1971), American baseball player
 Mike Hubbard (politician) (born 1959), American politician
 Michael Hubbard, guitarist and former member of the Australian rock band The Basics